North Mississippi Regional Park is a joint effort of the Minneapolis Park and Recreation Board and the Three Rivers Park District and lies within the larger Mississippi National River and Recreation Area. The park, located near the northern border of Minneapolis, Minnesota, borders the western shore of the Mississippi River. Connected to the Grand Rounds Scenic Byway through biking trails, it ties the Anoka County park system to the parkways of Minneapolis.

Great blue herons nest in the island trees along the banks.

Its intimate enclosed natural setting in the middle of a highly metropolitan area makes the park very attractive to a wide array of people. The park is a great place for people to bask with friends and family in the spring, summer or fall. Wild animals such as deer, fox and badgers can be found along the banks and are seen in late fall.

Amenities 

Fishing
Biking
Picnic area/pavilion
Wading pool/playground
Carl Kroening Interpretive Center
Boat launch

External links

 Carl Kroening Interpretive Center
 Three Rivers Park District
 Anoka County Parks
 Mississippi National River and Recreation Area

Protected areas of Hennepin County, Minnesota
Mississippi National River and Recreation Area
Protected areas on the Mississippi River
Regional parks in Minnesota